Pulmapilt ("The Wedding") is a 1980 Estonian sci-fi film directed by Raul Tammet.

Awards, nominations, participations:
 1983: Soviet Estonia Film Festival (USSR), best male actor: Rein Aren

Plot
An elderly man saves the life of an alien who is capable of time travel. They go back in time to the man's wedding day.

Cast

 Rein Aren 
 Lembit Ulfsak 
 Ella Rihvk
 Paul Laasik
 Katrin Püttsepp

References

External links
 
 Pulmapilt, entry in Estonian Film Database (EFIS)

1980 films
Estonian science fiction films
Estonian-language films